James Kevin Brown (born March 14, 1965) is an American professional baseball right-handed pitcher who played in Major League Baseball (MLB) from 1986 to 2005 for the Texas Rangers, Baltimore Orioles, Florida Marlins, San Diego Padres, Los Angeles Dodgers, and New York Yankees. Brown led the American League in wins once and led the National League in earned run average twice. He was a six-time MLB All-Star and threw a no-hitter in 1997.

Amateur years
Brown attended Wilkinson County High School in Irwinton, Georgia, and was a student and a letterman in football, baseball, and tennis. Brown played three years of college baseball at Georgia Tech for their baseball team.

Professional career

Texas Rangers
The Texas Rangers selected Brown in the first round, with the fourth pick overall, in the 1986 Major League Baseball draft.

Baltimore Orioles

Florida Marlins
Following the  season, Brown again became a free agent, signing with the Florida Marlins. In his first season with the Marlins, Brown posted a 17–11 record with 159 strikeouts and an MLB best 1.89 ERA, finishing second in the Cy Young Award voting.

In , Brown threw a one-hitter against the Los Angeles Dodgers in his first appearance and a no-hitter against the San Francisco Giants on June 10, 1997. The only baserunner in the game for the Giants came via a HBP with two outs and two strikes in the eighth inning.

In the 1997 National League Championship Series, Brown, riddled with the flu, proceeded to pitch a complete game in Game Six, defeating the Atlanta Braves and helping the Marlins reach the World Series, which they eventually won over the Cleveland Indians.

San Diego Padres
Following the disassembly of the Marlins' championship team, Brown was traded to the San Diego Padres for Derrek Lee and prospects, where he pitched one season.  He posted an 18–7 record with a career-high 257 strikeouts and a 2.38 ERA, finishing third in the Cy Young Award voting.

Masterful during the National League Division Series against the Houston Astros, San Diego won both of Brown's starts by a 2–1 score.  As the Game 1 starter opposing Randy Johnson, he allowed no runs in eight innings and struck out 16 Astros, a career-high, and second to that point in MLB playoff history only to Bob Gibson's 17-strikeout performance in the 1968 World Series.

He helped to lead the Padres to the World Series, but not before blowing a save in Game 5 of the NLCS during a rare relief appearance.  The Padres would then lose to the New York Yankees in the 1998 World Series in a four-game sweep.

Los Angeles Dodgers
Following the  season, Brown again became a free agent. He signed a lucrative contract with the Los Angeles Dodgers for 7 years/$105 million USD, becoming the first $100 million man in baseball. Enrique Rojas of ESPN Deportes called the contract "one of the worst deals ever from a team's point of view" because Brown averaged only nine wins per season and was frequently injured during the seven years of the deal. That contract was once listed as the 82nd largest in the history of sports tied with NBA Star Juwan Howard.

His first season in Los Angeles, he posted an 18–9 record with 221 strikeouts and a 3.00 ERA.  After leading the NL in ERA during an injury-plagued  season, his performance began to dwindle as Brown was hampered by injuries and poor run support. In , Brown rebounded, producing a respectable 14–9 record with 185 strikeouts and a 2.39 ERA.

New York Yankees
On December 11, 2003, Brown was traded to the New York Yankees as part of a deal that sent Jeff Weaver, Yhency Brazobán, Brandon Weeden, and $2.6 million in cash to Los Angeles.  In 2004, he posted a 10–6 record with a 4.09 ERA, but experienced health problems during the season.  Toward the end of the season, he punched a wall in frustration, injuring his hand.  He pitched well in the Division Series, but it was his performance in Game 7 of the 2004 American League Championship Series that he is remembered for, lasting less than two innings while giving up five earned runs, including a two-run homer to David Ortiz.

Brown attempted to come back in  but missed several games during the season due to injury. He went 4–7 with a 6.50 ERA. On February 20, Brown announced his retirement.

Mitchell Report
The Mitchell Report named Brown as one of a group of Los Angeles Dodgers implicated in steroid use. The report documents allegations by Kirk Radomski that he sold Brown human growth hormone and Deca-Durabolin over a period of two or three years beginning in either 2000 or 2001. Radomski claims he was introduced to Brown by Paul Lo Duca. Radomski's claims were supported by an Express Mail receipt dated June 7, 2004, addressed to Brown. The report also contains notes from a meeting of Dodgers executives in 2003 during which they question the medication Brown takes and include a note stating "Steroids speculated by GM". Brown declined to meet with the Mitchell investigators.

Bill Plaschke states that by 2003 "it was obvious to me...(and) Dodger management that...(he was) probably on steroids. We would even talk about it while watching their bulging, straining bodies from the dugout during batting practice. But the players would admit nothing, so there was nothing I could write."  Brown's temper tantrums, he notes, may have in fact been "'roid rage."

Pitching assessment
Brown was a pitcher who had the rare talent of relying both on movement and velocity. His main pitch was a sinking fastball that averaged 91–96 mph, with tremendous tailing, downward movement. He could spot it to either side of the plate. Batters facing him generally pounded this pitch into the ground or missed it entirely. He complemented this pitch with a sharp slider in the high 80s and a solid split fingered fastball he used against left-handed hitters or for another look.

Over his career, Brown won 211 games and finished his career with a 127 ERA+ (27% better than the league-wide earned run average). Only seven pitchers have won between 200 and 220 wins with an ERA+ between 120 and 135. Of those seven, Stan Coveleski (215 wins, 128 ERA+), John Smoltz (213/125), Don Drysdale (209/121), and Hal Newhouser (207/130) are in the Baseball Hall of Fame. Only Curt Schilling, Eddie Cicotte (209/123) of Black Sox infamy and Brown have been excluded.

Personal life
Brown currently resides in Macon, Georgia with his wife Candace, and four sons: Ridge, Grayson, Dawson, and Maclain. He is currently an assistant baseball coach at Tattnall Square Academy.

See also

 List of Major League Baseball annual shutout leaders
 List of Major League Baseball career games started leaders
 List of Major League Baseball career hit batsmen leaders
 List of Major League Baseball career putouts as a pitcher leaders
 List of Major League Baseball career strikeout leaders
 List of Major League Baseball career wild pitches leaders
 List of Major League Baseball career wins leaders
 List of Major League Baseball no-hitters
 List of Major League Baseball players named in the Mitchell Report
 List of Miami Marlins no-hitters
 List of Miami Marlins team records
 List of World Series starting pitchers

References

External links

1965 births
Living people
Major League Baseball pitchers
American League All-Stars
American League wins champions
National League All-Stars
National League ERA champions
Baltimore Orioles players
Florida Marlins players
Los Angeles Dodgers players
New York Yankees players
San Diego Padres players
Texas Rangers players
Baseball players from Georgia (U.S. state)
People from Milledgeville, Georgia
People from Wilkinson County, Georgia
Drugs in sport in the United States
Georgia Tech Yellow Jackets baseball players
Sacramento City Panthers baseball players
Gulf Coast Rangers players
Tulsa Drillers players
Charlotte Rangers players
Oklahoma City 89ers players
Las Vegas 51s players
Staten Island Yankees players
Trenton Thunder players
Columbus Clippers players